Meskigal (mes-ki-g̃al₂-la) was a Sumerian ruler of the Mesopotamian city of Adab in the mid-3rd millennium BCE, probably circa 2350 BCE. He was contemporary with Lugal-zage-si and the founder of the Akkadian Empire, Sargon of Akkad. 

In a fragmentary inscription, he claimed to have been on an expedition to the "Mountain of the Cedar forests" (KURg̃eš-erin, Lebanon), perhaps together with Sargon I: 

It has been suggested that Meskigal had actually defected to the Akkadian Empire, in opposition to Lugal-zage-si. Another known case is Lugalushumgal, who was also a collaborator of the Akkadian Empire.

According to an inscription however, the Akkadian ruler Rimush, successor of Sargon, captured him following a rebellion:

It is uncertain if this is the same Meskigal being mentioned in these several inscriptions.

There is a statue of Meskigal in the Baghdad Museum, in a style reminiscent of Akkadian statuary. Meskigal is also known from inscriptions.

References

Sumerian kings
24th-century BC Sumerian kings
Kings of Adab
Ancient rebels